Dongli District is a district of the municipality of Tianjin, People's Republic of China. Located in the district are Tianjin Binhai International Airport and Tianjin Airlines headquarters.

Administrative divisions
There are 9 subdistricts in the district:

Transportation

Metro
Dongli is currently served by two metro lines operated by Tianjin Metro:

  - Yudongcheng, Dengzhoulu, Guoshanlu, Konggangjingjiqu, Binhaiguojijichang
  - Xinli, Dongli Economic Development Area, Xiaodongzhuang, Junliangcheng, Tianjin Pipe Corporation

Climate 

Dongli District has a humid continental climate (Köppen climate classification Dwa).

References

Districts of Tianjin